Tapaninvainio (Finnish), Staffansslätten (Swedish) is a northern neighborhood of Helsinki, Finland.

Neighbourhoods of Helsinki